Parsons Marine Steam Turbine Company was a British engineering company based on the River Tyne at Wallsend, North East England.

History
Charles Algernon Parsons founded the company in 1897 with £500,000 of capital. It specialised in building the steam turbine engines that he had invented for marine use. The first vessel powered by a Parsons turbine was Turbinia, launched in 1894. Although both these vessels came to grief, the new engines were not to blame, and the Admiralty was convinced. Parsons' son became a director in the company and was replaced during the First World War by his daughter Rachel Parsons.

Parsons turbines powered the Royal Navy's first turbine powered battleship, and the world's first turbine ocean liners,  and Virginian.

All early marine turbines drove their propellers directly. Parsons developed helical reduction gearing for marine turbines, and in 1908 converted the cargo ship  to turbine propulsion with reduction gearing.

Four direct-drive Parsons turbines powered battleship .

The Royal Navy, Royal Canadian Navy and Royal Australian Navy used Parsons turbines on their  destroyers. The s all used Parsons propulsion systems.

In 1944, Parsons was one of 19 companies which formed the 'Parsons and Marine Engineering Turbine Research and Development Association', usually known as Pametrada.

The destroyer , launched in 1964, had a Parsons propulsion system.

The Cunard liner Queen Elizabeth 2, launched in 1969, had Pametrada turbines.

The company was absorbed into C. A. Parsons and Company and survives in Heaton, Newcastle as part of Siemens, a German industrial conglomerate.

See also
 C. A. Parsons and Company

References

Further reading

1897 establishments in England
Companies based in Newcastle upon Tyne
Defunct shipbuilding companies of the United Kingdom
Manufacturing companies established in 1897